The Penghu County Government is the local government of Penghu County, Taiwan. Penghu County Hall is located in Magong City.

History
Penghu County government was established on 22 January 1946.

Organizational structure

City and township offices
 Magong City Office
 Husi Township Office
 Baisha Township Office
 Siyu Township Office
 Wang-an Township Office
 Cimei Township Office

County government headquarter
 Executive Officer
 Senior Secretary
 Secretary
 Consumer Protection Officer

Internal unit
 Civil Affairs Department
 Finance Department
 Economic Affairs Department
 Education Department
 Public Works Department
 Tourism Department
 Social Affairs Department
 General Affairs Department
 Personnel Department
 Civil service Ethics Department
 Accounting and Statistics Department

External agencies

Organizations
 Police Bureau
 Environmental Protection Bureau
 Local Tax Bureau
 Fire Bureau
 Agriculture and Fisheries Bureau
 City Bus and Ferry Management Office
 Public Health Bureau
 Cultural Affairs Bureau

Subsidiaries
 Land Office
 Animal Disease Control Center
 County Stadium
 Marine Life Propagation Station
 Family Education Center
 Penghu County Forestry and Park Management Center
 Magong City Household Registration Office
 Baisha Township Household Registration Office
 Huxi Township Household Registration Office
 Cimei Township Household Registration Office
 Wangan Township Household Registration Office
 Xiyu Township Household Registration Office

See also
 Penghu County Council
 List of county magistrates of Penghu

References

External links

 

1946 establishments in Taiwan
Government agencies established in 1946
Local governments of the Republic of China
Penghu County